Luis Alberto Rijo (28 September 1927 – 8 May 2001) was a Uruguayan footballer, who played as a forward for Central Español. He never played any international matches in his career, but was part of the Uruguay national team which won 1950 FIFA World Cup.

References
World Cup Champions Squads 1930 - 2002
A primeira grande zebra do Mundial (in Spanish)

1927 births
Uruguayan footballers
Uruguay international footballers
1950 FIFA World Cup players
FIFA World Cup-winning players
Central Español players
2001 deaths

Association football forwards